Raoua Tlili (born October 5, 1989) is a Paralympian athlete from Tunisia competing mainly in category F41 shot put and discus events and is a multi gold medalist at the Paralympics.

Career
Tlili made her senior international debut back in 2006, she competed in the 2008 Summer Paralympics in Beijing, China, there she won a gold medal in the women's shot put F40 event throwing a new world record of 8.95 meters and also a silver medal in the women's discus throw F40 event.

Four years later she competed in the 2012 Summer Paralympics in London, UK. She matched her medal tally from Beijing, again winning the gold medal in the F40 shot put in another world record distance of 9.86 meters, she also backed that up with another silver medal in the F40 discus  event.

At the 2016 Summer Olympics she managed to win gold medals in both here events, firstly she won in the F41 shot put throwing a distance of 10.19 meters winning by 1.80 meters, then six days later she throw a new world record distance of 33.38 meters to win the F40/F41 discus gold medal.

In between the Summer Olympics her success continued at the IPC Athletics World Championships, with gold medals in the F40/F41 shot put in 2011 and 2015, and in the F40/F41 discus she won gold in 2013 and 2015 with a silver medal in 2011. In 2019, she won the gold medal in the women's shot put F41 event at the 2019 World Para Athletics Championships.

IPC Records 
As of October 2016, Tlili is the owner of IPC world records of 33.38 meters in the discus category F41, which is also the Paralympic record, and she is also the Paralympic record holder in the F41 shot put with 10.19, she also holds the IPC Athletics World Championships records in shot put and discus, she set them both at the 2015 IPC Athletics World Championships.

Events
 Women's Shot Put - F41
 Women's Discus Throw - F41

References

External links
 

Paralympic athletes of Tunisia
Paralympic gold medalists for Tunisia
Paralympic silver medalists for Tunisia
Tunisian female shot putters
Tunisian female discus throwers
Living people
World record holders in Paralympic athletics
1989 births
Medalists at the 2008 Summer Paralympics
Medalists at the 2012 Summer Paralympics
Medalists at the 2016 Summer Paralympics
Medalists at the 2020 Summer Paralympics
Athletes (track and field) at the 2008 Summer Paralympics
Athletes (track and field) at the 2012 Summer Paralympics
Athletes (track and field) at the 2016 Summer Paralympics
Athletes (track and field) at the 2020 Summer Paralympics
Competitors in athletics with dwarfism
World Para Athletics Championships winners
Paralympic medalists in athletics (track and field)
21st-century Tunisian women